Brian Maisonneuve (born June 28, 1973 in Warren, Michigan) is an American retired soccer player and current coach of the Ohio State Buckeyes.  He spent his entire professional career as a defensive midfielder with the Columbus Crew of Major League Soccer.  He was a member of the U.S. soccer teams at both the 1996 Summer Olympics and the 1998 FIFA World Cup, earning a total of thirteen caps with the U.S. national team.

Youth and college
Maisonneuve played for the Carpathia Kickers in Metro Detroit as a child and teen. He played his high school soccer at De La Salle Collegiate High School of Warren, Michigan. He played college soccer at Indiana University from 1991 to 1994, winning the Hermann Trophy his senior season, as well as finishing his career as the Big Ten's all-time top goalscorer with 44, and helping Indiana to the NCAA Championship game, losing 1–2 to Virginia.

Club career
He was allocated to the Columbus Crew for the 1996 MLS season, becoming one of two players without any pro experience on the league's initial allocation list; the other was Damian Silvera. Maisonneuve would quickly earn a starting spot with the Crew, and would hold on to it for the next 8 years. He started 83 games for the Crew between 1996 and 1999.

Before the 2000 season, he suffered a series of devastating ankle injuries, forcing him to sit out the season and threatening his career.  Maisonneuve returned in 2001, however, and slotted right back into his starting role.  He would remain there for the next three years, before finally losing his spot when the Crew acquired Simon Elliott prior to the 2004 season; Maisonneuve would go on to play only nine games in 2004.

By Major League Soccer's ninth year, Maisonneuve was one of only two players to have played for a single club throughout that period, and when he retired after the season, he left Cobi Jones as the lone player with that distinction. Maisonneuve scored 23 goals and 37 assists in his pro career.

International career
After graduating from Indiana University, Maisonneuve spent 1995 training with the U.S. Olympic Team; he later played in the 1996 Summer Olympics. During his professional career, Maisonneuve was a fringe player for the United States national team, totalling just 13 caps with the team.  Despite his limited playing time, Maisonneuve did play all three of the United States' games at the 1998 FIFA World Cup in France.

Coaching career
Following his retirement in 2004, Maisonneuve joined the United States U-17 team as an assistant coach, spending four years there. In 2008, he joined the Louisville Cardinals men's soccer team coaching staff as an assistant coach. He would stay with the team for two years, during which time they had a 24–11–4 record. In 2010 Maisonneuve joined the Indiana Hoosiers men's soccer team coaching staff as an assistant coach. During his tenure, he helped the team to an NCAA Division I Championship in 2012, a regular season championship in 2010, a Big Ten Tournament Championship in 2013, and an overall record of 102–42–34. On April 23, 2018, Maisonneuve was announced as the head coach of the Ohio State Buckeyes men's soccer team.

Career statistics

Honors

Club
Columbus Crew
 Lamar Hunt U.S. Open Cup: 2002
 MLS Supporters' Shield: 2004

Individual
Hermann Trophy: 1994

References

External links
 Ohio State Buckeyes bio

1973 births
American soccer players
All-American men's college soccer players
Indiana Hoosiers men's soccer players
Columbus Crew players
1998 FIFA World Cup players
Olympic soccer players of the United States
Footballers at the 1996 Summer Olympics
Living people
Sportspeople from Warren, Michigan
Soccer players from Michigan
United States men's international soccer players
2002 CONCACAF Gold Cup players
CONCACAF Gold Cup-winning players
Major League Soccer players
United States men's under-23 international soccer players
Association football midfielders
Hermann Trophy men's winners